WinRoll is an open source, free software utility for Windows 2000, Windows XP and Windows 7 which allows the user to "roll up" windows into their title bars, in addition to other window management related features. It is compiled in assembly code.

History
WinRoll 1.0 was first released on April 10, 2003. It is unclear if it still maintained by Wil Palma. The most recent version, 2.0, was released on April 7, 2004. Being an open source program, its source code was freely available from the website.  The website is now down.

Features
The purpose of WinRoll is to allow users to have many windows on the screen, while keeping them organized and manageable. The main feature of the program is enabling the user to "roll" windows up into their title bars. It also allows users to minimize programs to the tray, and to adjust the opacity of windows.

See also
 Free software
 Open source software
 Assembly language

Free software primarily written in assembly language
Free system software
Windows-only free software